The 1976 AFC Asian Cup was the 6th edition of the men's AFC Asian Cup, a quadrennial international football tournament organised by the Asian Football Confederation (AFC). The finals were hosted by Iran between 3 and 13 June 1976. The field of six teams was split into two groups of three. Iran won their third title in a row, beating Kuwait in the final.

Qualification 

Venues 
The two host cities, Tehran and Tabriz, with two venues was used for the 1976 AFC Asian Cup.

Squads

Group stage

Group A

Group B

Knockout stage

Semi-finals

Third place play-off

Final

Goalscorers 

With three goals, Gholam Hossein Mazloumi, Nasser Nouraei and Fathi Kameel are the top scorers in the tournament. In total, 25 goals were scored by 16 different players, with none of them credited as own goal.

3 goals

  Fathi Kameel
  Gholam Hossein Mazloumi
  Nasser Nouraei

2 goals

  Alireza Azizi
  Alireza Khorshidi
  Hassan Roshan

1 goal

  Abdulaziz Al-Anberi
  Ali Parvin
  Faisal Al-Dakhil
  Falah Hassan
  Faruq Ibrahim
  He Jia
  Kadhim Waal
  Mokhtar Dahari
  Sabah Abdul-Jalil
  Wang Jilian

Final positions

References

External links 
 Details at RSSSF

 
AFC
AFC Asian Cup tournaments
International association football competitions hosted by Iran
Asian Cup
June 1976 sports events in Asia